The 1964 Harelbeke–Antwerp–Harelbeke was the seventh edition of the E3 Harelbeke cycle race and was held on 14 March 1964. The race started and finished in Harelbeke. The race was won by Rik Van Looy.

General classification

Notes

References

1964 in Belgian sport
1964